The Volunteer is a 1917 American silent drama film directed by Harley Knoles and starring Madge Evans, Henry Hull and Muriel Ostriche. It was shot at Fort Lee studios.

Cast

References

Bibliography
 Paul M. Edwards. World War I on Film: English Language Releases through 2014. McFarland, 2016.

External links
 

1917 films
1917 drama films
1910s English-language films
American silent feature films
Silent American drama films
Films directed by Harley Knoles
American black-and-white films
World Film Company films
Films shot in Fort Lee, New Jersey
1910s American films